Inn at Fowlerstown, also known as Drover's Inn, is a historic hotel located near Wellsburg in Brooke County, West Virginia, United States. The inn was built between 1848 and 1851, and is a 2½-story brick building in the Greek Revival style.  The property also includes a two-story log house (1820) and frame cottage that pre-date the inn. Contributing outbuildings are a small clapboard well house, chicken coop, and privy.  Before 1938, the inn housed a general store and post office that served the small village of Fowlerstown.  The village grew up around along Washington Pike at the grist mill established by William Fowler.

It was listed on the National Register of Historic Places in 1992.

References

External links
Official website

Hotel buildings on the National Register of Historic Places in West Virginia
Greek Revival architecture in West Virginia
Commercial buildings completed in 1851
Buildings and structures in Brooke County, West Virginia
National Register of Historic Places in Brooke County, West Virginia
1851 establishments in Virginia